José Ramón Ferrer Cruz (born September 23, 1968) is a Mexican sprint canoer. He competed from the early 1990s to the early 2000s. Ferrer competed in two Summer Olympics, earning his best finish of sixth in the C-2 1000 m event at the 2000 Sydney Olympics.

Career
Ferrer won a bronze medal in the C-4 1000 m event at the 1994 ICF Canoe Sprint World Championships in Mexico City.

Ferrer reached the highest finish of any Mexican canoeist in the 2000 Sydney Olympics along with Antonio Romero finishing in 6th place and establishing himself as an icon of Mexican canoeing.

References

Sports-reference.com profile

1968 births
Canoeists at the 1992 Summer Olympics
Canoeists at the 2000 Summer Olympics
Living people
Mexican male canoeists
Olympic canoeists of Mexico
ICF Canoe Sprint World Championships medalists in Canadian
Pan American Games medalists in canoeing
Pan American Games bronze medalists for Mexico
Canoeists at the 1991 Pan American Games
Medalists at the 1991 Pan American Games
20th-century Mexican people